Sulfabenzamide is an antibacterial/antimicrobial. Often used in conjunction with sulfathiazole and sulfacetamide (trade name – Sultrin) as a topical, intravaginal antibacterial preparation.

Notes

Sulfonamide antibiotics
Benzamides
Abandoned drugs